Dana Kirk (born June 23, 1984) is an American former competition swimmer, Olympian and Pan American Games medalist.

Kirk qualified for the 2004 Summer Olympics in the women's 200-meter butterfly, and finishing ninth in the event semifinals.

Kirk attended Stanford University, where she swam for the Stanford Cardinal swimming and diving team in National Collegiate Athletic Association (NCAA) competition.  During her four-year college swimming career, she amassed seventeen All-American honors and eight Pac-10 Conference titles in the 200-yard medley and 400-yard medley relays, as well as the 100-yard and 200-yard butterfly events.  She is currently the fourth fastest 100-yard and 200-yard butterfly swimmer in Stanford history.  She graduated from Stanford in 2006.

Kirk's older sister, Tara, joined her on the 2004 USA Women's Olympic Swimming team, becoming the first set of sisters to swim on the same U.S. Olympic Team.

After back surgery, Kirk retired from swimming at the Olympic level.  She currently coaches for the Palo Alto Stanford Aquatics (PASA) in Los Altos Hills, California at the Fremont Hills Country Club.

See also
 List of Stanford University people

References

External links
 
 
 
 
 

1984 births
Living people
American female butterfly swimmers
American female medley swimmers
Olympic swimmers of the United States
People from Bremerton, Washington
Sportspeople from Washington (state)
Stanford Cardinal women's swimmers
Swimmers at the 2003 Pan American Games
Swimmers at the 2004 Summer Olympics
Pan American Games bronze medalists for the United States
Pan American Games medalists in swimming
Medalists at the 2003 Pan American Games
21st-century American women